Pyrromethene is a dye used in solid-state dye lasers. As a structural motif it is similar to the naturally occurring tetrapyrrole class of compounds.

See also
 Azadipyrromethene

References

Laser science
Dyes